César Díaz Pizarro (born 16 September 1990 in Chiclayo, Peru) is a Peruvian footballer.

Career

College

Diaz Pizarro played college at the UC Riverside from 2008–2011. During his time at Riverside he was named Big West Offensive player of the year and All Big West first team in 2011.

Professional

Diaz Pizarro was selected in the second round of the 2012 MLS Supplemental Draft (25th overall) by the San Jose Earthquakes club and was signed 2 weeks later.

He made his professional MLS debut on 27 May 2012, in the 60th minute in a 2–1 loss against Sporting KC. After struggling with a sports hernia throughout the year, he underwent surgery after the end of the regular season.

Honors

San Jose Earthquakes
Major League Soccer Supporter's Shield (1): 2012

References

External links
 

1990 births
Living people
Association football forwards
Expatriate soccer players in the United States
Major League Soccer players
People from Chiclayo
People from Chino, California
Peruvian expatriate footballers
Peruvian footballers
San Jose Earthquakes draft picks
San Jose Earthquakes players
Soccer players from California
Sportspeople from San Bernardino County, California
UC Riverside Highlanders men's soccer players